Kasia a Polish diminutive form of given name, a shortened version of the name Katarzyna.

Notable people

Kasia Cerekwicka (born 1980), singer
Kasia Domanska (born 1972), painter
Kasia Haddad (born 1979), British actress
Kasia Kowalska (born 1973), singer
Kasia Kulesza (born 1976), Canadian Olympic medallist in synchronized swimming
Kasia Madera, British television news presenter at the BBC
Kasia Miednik (born 1995), singer
Kasia Nosowska (born 1971), singer
Kasia Popowska (born 1989), singer
Kasia Selwand, curling player
Kasia Smutniak (born 1979), actress
Kasia Stankiewicz (born 1977), singer
Kasia Struss (born 1987), model
Kasia Al Thani (born 1976), third wife of Sheikh Abdulaziz Khalifa Al Thani
Kasia Wilk (born 1982), singer

Fictional characters
Kasia, character in Uprooted by Naomi Novik 

Kasia may also refer to:
Kushinagar, Uttar Pradesh –  Kasia is the nearest town to the holy place, Kushinagar
Kasia i Tomek, Polish title of Un gars, une fille
Kasia 100/170 mine, Polish anti vehicle mines
Kassia (fl. 9th-century), Byzantine abbess, poet, and hymnographer
Adam kasia, or the "hidden Adam" in Mandaeism
Zihrun Raza Kasia ("Zihrun the Hidden Mystery"), a Mandaean text

See also
Katarzyna (disambiguation)

Polish feminine given names